The Pedestal, now known as the Agrippa Pedestal located west of the Propylaea of Athens and the same height as the Temple of Athena Nike to the south, was built in honor of Eumenes II of Pergamon in 178 BC to commemorate his victory in the Panathenaic Games chariot race. Its height is 8.9 meters. It was the base of a bronze quadriga, life-size, probably driven by Eumenes and/or his brother Attalus II. Towards 27 BC, this chariot was replaced by another one, dedicated by the city of Athens to Marcus Agrippa, son-in-law of Augustus, in recognition of the reconstruction of the Odeon of Athens in front of the Agora of Athens; it disappeared on an unknown date.

References

External links

178 BC
27 BC
Ancient Greek buildings and structures in Athens
Acropolis of Athens
Marcus Vipsanius Agrippa